HRSS may refer to:

 Croatian Peasant Party, former name of a political party in Croatia
 HRSS (cryptography), an instantiation of NTRU cryptography used in CECPQ2